Thomas Savage may refer to:
Thomas Savage (bishop) (1449–1507), Archbishop of York
Thomas Savage (Shakespeare's trustee) (c. 1552–1611), goldsmith and seacoal-meter in London
Thomas Savage, 1st Viscount Savage (c. 1586-1635), also known as Sir Thomas Savage, 2nd Baronet between 1615 and 1626
Thomas Savage (major) (1608–1682), English soldier and New England colonist and merchant
Thomas Savage, 3rd Earl Rivers (1628–1694), English peer
Thomas Savage (Quebec politician) (1808–1887), merchant, shipowner and politician in the province of Quebec, Canada
Thomas S. Savage (1804–1880), American Protestant clergyman, missionary, physician and naturalist
Thomas Savage (novelist) (1915–2003), American author
Thomas R. Savage, American insurance executive

Tom Savage may refer to:
Tom Savage (bishop) (1900–1966), Anglican bishop
Tom Savage (painter) (born 1953), American painter
Tom Savage (social entrepreneur) (born 1979), social entrepreneur
Tom Savage (rugby union) (born 1989), Rugby union player Gloucester RFC
Tom Savage (American football) (born 1990), American football quarterback
Tom Savage (Irish media figure) (c. 1940–2017), chairman of the RTÉ Board
Tom Savage (poet) (born 1948), American poet